The Mabuso languages are a small family of closely related languages in New Guinea. They were linked with the Rai Coast languages in 1951 by Arthur Capell in his Madang family, which Wurm (1975) included in his Trans–New Guinea (TNG) phylum. Malcolm Ross reconstructed the pronouns of proto-Mabuso and noted that "the integrity of the Mabuso group is fairly obvious".

Languages
Hanseman languages (see)
South Mabuso
Kokon: Girawa, Kein (Bemal)
Munit–Gum
Munit
Gum languages (see)

References

Z'graggen, J.A. A comparative word list of the Mabuso languages, Madang Province, Papua New Guinea. D-32, xvi + 199 pages. Pacific Linguistics, The Australian National University, 1980. 

 
Languages of Papua New Guinea
Central Madang languages